The 2008 Rugby Canada Super League season was the eleventh and final season for the RCSL.

Standings
Western Conference
{| class="wikitable" style="text-align: center;"
|-
! width="250"|Team
! width="20"|Pld
! width="20"|W
! width="20"|L
! width="20"|D
! width="20"|F
! width="20"|A
! width="25"|+/-
! width="20"|BP
! width="20"|Pts
|-

|align=left| Calgary Mavericks
|4||4||0||0|| || || ||4||20
|-
|align=left| Edmonton Gold
|4||2||1||1|| || || ||2||12
|-
|align=left| Saskatchewan Prairie Fire
|4||1||2||1|| || || ||3||9
|-
|align=left| Vancouver Island Crimson Tide
|4||1||3||0|| || || ||4||8
|-
|align=left| Vancouver Wave
|4||1||3||0|| || || ||2||6
|}

Eastern Conference
{| class="wikitable" style="text-align: center;"
|-
! width="250"|Team
! width="20"|Pld
! width="20"|W
! width="20"|L
! width="20"|D
! width="20"|F
! width="20"|A
! width="25"|+/-
! width="20"|BP
! width="20"|Pts
|-

|align=left| Newfoundland Rock
|5||5||0||0|| || || ||4||24
|-
|align=left| Niagara Thunder
|5||3||1||1|| || || ||3||17
|-
|align=left| Quebec Caribou
|5||3||1||1|| || || ||3||17
|-
|align=left| New Brunswick Black Spruce
|5||2||3||0|| || || ||1||9
|-
|align=left| Nova Scotia Keltics
|5||1||4||0|| || || ||1||5
|-
|align=left| Ottawa Harlequins
|5||0||5||0|| || || ||0||0
|}

Note: 4 points for a win, 2 points for a draw, 1 bonus point for a loss by 7 points or less, 1 bonus point for scoring 4 tries or more.

Championship final

The championship game took place on August 9, 2008 between the Calgary Mavericks and the Newfoundland Rock in St. John's, at Swilers Rugby Park.  The game was won by the Newfoundland Rock by a score of 30-6.

External links
Standings

Rugby Canada Super League seasons
RCSL Season
RCSL